This is a list of the mammal species recorded in Cuba. Of the mammal species in Cuba, five of the species listed are considered to be extinct.

The following tags are used to highlight each species' conservation status as assessed by the International Union for Conservation of Nature:

Order: Sirenia (manatees and dugongs) 

Sirenia is an order of fully aquatic, herbivorous mammals that inhabit rivers, estuaries, coastal marine waters, swamps, and marine wetlands. All four species are endangered.
Family: Trichechidae
Genus: Trichechus
West Indian manatee, T. manatus

Order: Rodentia (rodents) 

Rodents make up the largest order of mammals, with over 40% of mammalian species. They have two incisors in the upper and lower jaw which grow continually and must be kept short by gnawing.
Suborder: Hystricomorpha
Family: Echimyidae
Subfamily: Heteropsomyinae
Genus: Boromys
Oriente cave rat, B. offella 
Torre's cave rat, B. torrei 
Family: Dasyproctidae
Genus: Dasyprocta	
Mexican agouti, D. mexicana  introduced
Central American agouti, D. punctata  introduced
Family: Cuniculidae
Genus: Cuniculus
Lowland paca, C. paca  introduced
Family: Capromyidae
Subfamily: Capromyinae
Genus: Capromys
Desmarest's hutia, C. pilorides 
Genus: Geocapromys
Cuban coney, G. columbianus 
Genus: Mesocapromys
Cabrera's hutia, M. angelcabrerai 
Eared hutia, M. auritus 
Dwarf hutia, M. nanus , possibly 
San Felipe hutia, M. sanfelipensis , possibly 
Genus: Mysateles
Garrido's hutia, M. garridoi , possibly 
Gundlach's hutia, M. gundlachi 
Black-tailed hutia, M. melanurus 
Southern hutia, M. meridionalis 
Prehensile-tailed hutia, M. prehensilis 
Suborder: Muridae
Family: Muridae
Genus: Mus
 House mouse, M. musculus  introduced
Genus: Rattus
 Brown rat, R. norvegicus  introduced
 Black rat, R. rattus  introduced

Order: Eulipotyphla (shrews, hedgehogs, moles, and solenodons) 

Eulipotyphlans are insectivorous mammals. Shrews and solenodons closely resemble mice, hedgehogs carry spines, while moles are stout-bodied burrowers.

Family: Nesophontidae
Genus: Nesophontes
Western Cuban nesophontes, N. micrus 
Family: Solenodontidae
Genus: Atopogale
Cuban solenodon, A. cubana

Order: Chiroptera (bats) 

The bats' most distinguishing feature is that their forelimbs are developed as wings, making them the only mammals capable of flight. Bat species account for about 20% of all mammals.
Family: Noctilionidae
Genus: Noctilio
Greater bulldog bat, N. leporinus 
Family: Vespertilionidae
Subfamily: Vespertilioninae
Genus: Antrozous
Pallid bat, A. pallidus 
Genus: Eptesicus
Big brown bat, E. fuscus 
Genus: Lasiurus
Eastern red bat, L. borealis 
Family: Molossidae
Genus: Eumops
Wagner's bonneted bat, E. glaucinus 
Genus: Mormopterus
Little goblin bat, M. minutus 
Genus: Nyctinomops
Broad-eared bat, N. laticaudatus 
Big free-tailed bat, N. macrotis 
Genus: Tadarida
Mexican free-tailed bat, T. brasiliensis 
Family: Mormoopidae
Genus: Mormoops
Antillean ghost-faced bat, M. blainvillii 
Genus: Pteronotus
Macleay's mustached bat, P. macleayii 
Parnell's mustached bat, P. parnellii 
Sooty mustached bat, P. quadridens 
Family: Phyllostomidae
Subfamily: Phyllostominae
Genus: Macrotus
Waterhouse's leaf-nosed bat, M. waterhousii 
Subfamily: Brachyphyllinae
Genus: Brachyphylla
Cuban fruit-eating bat, B. nana 
Subfamily: Phyllonycterinae
Genus: Erophylla
Buffy flower bat, E. sezekorni 
Genus: Phyllonycteris
Cuban flower bat, P. poeyi 
Subfamily: Glossophaginae
Genus: Monophyllus
Leach's single leaf bat, M. redmani 
Subfamily: Stenodermatinae
Genus: Artibeus
Jamaican fruit bat, A. jamaicensis 
Genus: Phyllops
Cuban fig-eating bat, P. falcatus 
Family: Natalidae
Genus: Chilonatalus
Cuban funnel-eared bat, C. micropus 
Genus: Nyctiellus
Gervais's funnel-eared bat, N. lepidus

Order: Cetacea (whales) 

The order Cetacea includes whales, dolphins and porpoises. They are the mammals most fully adapted to aquatic life with a spindle-shaped nearly hairless body, protected by a thick layer of blubber, and forelimbs and tail modified to provide propulsion underwater.

Suborder: Mysticeti
Family: Balaenopteridae (baleen whales)
Family: Balaenidae
Genus: Eubalaena
 North Atlantic right whale, Eubalaena glacialis 
Genus: Balaenoptera 
 Common minke whale, B. acutorostrata 
 Sei whale, B. borealis 
 Bryde's whale, B. brydei 
 Blue whale, B. musculus 
Genus: Megaptera
 Humpback whale, M. novaeangliae 
Suborder: Odontoceti
Superfamily: Platanistoidea
Family: Delphinidae (marine dolphins)
Genus: Delphinus
 Short-beaked common dolphin, D. delphis 
Genus: Feresa
 Pygmy killer whale, F. attenuata 
Genus: Globicephala
 Short-finned pilot whale, G. macrorhyncus 
Genus: Lagenodelphis
 Fraser's dolphin, L. hosei 
Genus: Grampus
 Risso's dolphin, G. griseus 
Genus: Orcinus
 Killer whale, O. orca 
Genus: Peponocephala
 Melon-headed whale, P. electra 
Genus: Pseudorca
 False killer whale, P. crassidens 
Genus: Stenella
 Pantropical spotted dolphin, Stenella attenuata 
 Clymene dolphin, S. clymene 
 Striped dolphin, S. coeruleoalba 
 Atlantic spotted dolphin, S. frontalis 
 Spinner dolphin, S. longirostris 
Genus: Steno
 Rough-toothed dolphin, S. bredanensis 
Genus: Tursiops
 Common bottlenose dolphin, T. truncatus 
Family: Physeteridae (sperm whales)
Genus: Physeter
 Sperm whale, P. macrocephalus 
Family: Kogiidae (dwarf sperm whales)
Genus: Kogia
 Pygmy sperm whale, K. breviceps 
 Dwarf sperm whale, K. sima 
Superfamily Ziphioidea
Family: Ziphidae (beaked whales)
Genus: Mesoplodon
 Gervais' beaked whale, M. europaeus 
 Blainville's beaked whale, M. densirostris 
 True's beaked whale, M. mirus 
Genus: Ziphius
 Cuvier's beaked whale, Z. cavirostris

Order: Carnivora (carnivorans) 

There are over 260 species of carnivores, the majority of which eat meat as their primary dietary item. They have a characteristic skull shape and dentition.

Suborder: Procyonidae
Family: Procyonidae
Genus: Procyon
 Raccoon, P. lotor  introduced, extirpated
Family: Herpestidae
Genus: Urva
 Small Indian mongoose, U. auropunctata  introduced
Suborder: Caniformia
Family: Phocidae (earless seals)
Genus: Neomonachus
Caribbean monk seal, N. tropicalis

Order: Artiodactyla (even-toed ungulates) 

The even-toed ungulates are ungulates – hoofed animals – which bear weight equally on two (an even number) of their five toes: the third and fourth. The other three toes are either present, absent, vestigial, or pointing posteriorly.
Family: Cervidae
Subfamily: Capreolinae
Genus: Odocoileus
 White-tailed deer, O. virginianus  introduced
Family Suidae (pigs)
Genus: Sus
Wild boar, S. scrofa  introduced
Family: Tayassuidae (peccaries)
Genus: Tayassu
 White-lipped peccary, T. pecari  introduced, extirpated

See also
List of chordate orders
List of prehistoric mammals
Lists of mammals by region
Mammal classification
List of mammals described in the 2000s

Notes

References
 

Cuba

Mammals
Cuba